Sunday for Sammy is a series of biennial charity concerts held in aid of the Sammy Johnson Memorial Fund, which benefits young performers. The fund was established in memorial to Sammy Johnson, an actor from North East England, who died suddenly in 1998.

The concerts have been held at Newcastle City Hall, with the exception of 2006, when the show was hosted at The Sage Gateshead. Due to the popularity of tickets, the 2018 event was held at Metro Radio Arena.

The show is performed twice on one day, with each being recorded for a DVD release, from which 75% of profits go to the fund. As of 2016, there have been nine events, with seven filmed for DVD release.

The concerts are hosted by Tim Healy and (until 2008) Jimmy Nail, who were close friends of Sammy Johnson, and features a range of personalities hailing from North East England, including Denise Welch, Billy Mitchell and Brendan Healy. It has featured guest appearances from people such as Ant and Dec and Mark Knopfler. Writers Dick Clement and Ian La Frenais contribute sketches based on their television series Auf Wiedersehen, Pet, which have featured guest appearances from the surviving original 'magnificent seven'. The concerts usually conclude with all of the performers returning to the stage to sing, most commonly Lindisfarne's "Run for Home".

Tribute shows for Sunday for Sammy are also popular. Most recently a competition for sketches was organised by North East based playwright Ed Waugh.

Shows

References

External links

Benefit concerts in the United Kingdom
Culture in Newcastle upon Tyne